Dzimitry Hancharuk (or Goncharuk, Russian: Дмитрий Гончарук, born 17 July 1970) is a Belarusian shot putter. His best finishes include eighth place at the 1995 World Championships and ninth place at the 1996 Olympic Games. His personal best is 20.12 metres, achieved in June 2001 in Vaasa.

Achievements

External links

1970 births
Living people
Belarusian male shot putters
Athletes (track and field) at the 1996 Summer Olympics
Olympic athletes of Belarus